Vox Dei para Vox Dei is the seventh studio album by the Argentine rock band Vox Dei. It is the band's only album with Carlos Rodriguez on rhythm guitar.

Background 
Ricardo Soulé would leave after the making of and touring this album, returning later during the early 1978. In early 1974, Soulé received an invitation from Danny Peyronel to go to England, where the band Heavy Metal Kids made a Vox Dei cover: "Canción Para Una Mujer Que No Está", retitled as "It's The Same" on their debut album, which the band performed at Wembley Stadium in London. After few shows with the group together with Carlos Rodriguez, Soulé accepted a proposal from Pappo to travel with him for a season in England, leaving Vox Dei.

The cover of the album managed to catch the spirit of the group at that time: a photo that shows Vox Dei in a stage, while they themselves are their only spectators.

Track listing 
All songs written by Ricardo Soulé except where noted.

LP
Side One
"Es necesario salirte a buscar" - 4:39
"La luz que crea" - 5:21
"No hay nada más terrible que el maldito bong" (Willy Quiroga, Rubén Basoalto) - 2:52
"No, ni por equivocación" (Willy Quiroga) - 4:18
"Quiero estar seguro de vivir" - 2:39
Side Two
"Mago de los cuatro vientos" (Willy Quiroga) - 4:57
"Algo esta cambiandome a mí" - 5:55
"Quiero darte mis días" - 3:51
"Tengo ganas de... estar con buena gente" (Willy Quiroga, Rubén Basoalto) - 3:15

CD
"Es necesario salirte a buscar" - 4:39
"La luz que crea" - 5:21
"No hay nada más terrible que el maldito bong" (Willy Quiroga, Rubén Basoalto) - 2:52
"Tengo ganas de... estar con buena gente" (Willy Quiroga, Rubén Basoalto) - 3:15
"Quiero estar seguro de vivir" - 2:39
"Mago de los cuatro vientos" (Willy Quiroga) - 4:57
"Algo esta cambiandome a mí" - 5:55
"Quiero darte mis días" - 3:51
"No, ni por equivocación" (Willy Quiroga) - 4:18

Credits
Vox Dei
Willy Quiroga - Bass guitar and vocals.
Ricardo Soulé - Vocals, electric and acoustic guitars, keyboards on "Quiero darte mis días".
Rubén Basoalto - Drums and vocals.

Guests
Carlos Rodriguez - Rhythm guitar on "Algo esta cambiándome a mí" and "Es necesario salirte a buscar".
Andres Massetti - Arrangements and orchestration in "Mago de los cuatro vientos".
Nacho Smilari - Piano on "No hay nada más terrible que el maldito bong".

References

External links 
Vox Dei's official webpage (Spanish)
Vox Dei discography (Spanish)

Vox Dei albums
1974 albums